Prunus ramburii ("sloe of Sierra Nevada") is a species of plant in the family Rosaceae. It is endemic to Spain.  It is threatened by habitat loss.

References

Flora of Spain
ramburii
Vulnerable plants
Taxonomy articles created by Polbot
Taxa named by Pierre Edmond Boissier
ramburii